Sunny is a 1930 American pre-Code musical comedy film directed by William A. Seiter and starring Lawrence Gray, O. P. Heggie, and Inez Courtney. It was produced and released by First National Pictures. The film was based on the Broadway stage hit, Sunny, produced by Charles Dillingham, which played from September 22, 1925, to December 11, 1926. Marilyn Miller, who had played the leading part in the Broadway production, was hired by Warner Brothers to reprise the role that made her the highest-paid star on Broadway.

Plot
Marylin Miller plays the part of an American circus performer, doing her act in a British circus, who is engaged to a man she does not love. A former boyfriend, played by Lawrence Gray, stops by to see her before taking a boat back to the United States. Miller realizing that she loves Gray, decides to run away. She embarks on the same boat that Lawrence takes. Her father, who realizes what his daughter has done, reaches the boat just as it is about to leave and manages to board it. While on board, Gray becomes engaged to be married to a wealthy socialite (Barbara Bedford). Miller learns that she will not be allowed to disembark in the United States without a passport. To land, Miller marries an American friend, intending to divorce him as soon as she is safely inside the United States. After arriving in the States, Miller tells Gray about her love for him. Bedford overhears them and tells Gray that she will announce their engagement at a party that very night. Disappointed, Miller decides to return to England, but Gray proposes to her just as she is about to leave.

Cast
Marilyn Miller as Sunny Peters
Lawrence Gray as Tom Warren
Joe Donahue as James Denning
O. P. Heggie as Mr. Peters
Inez Courtney as Weenie
Barbara Bedford as Margaret Manners
Judith Vosselli as Sue Warren
Clyde Cook as Sam
Mackenzie Ward as Harold Harcourt Wendell-Wendell

uncredited
Harry Allen as Side Show Barker
B. F. Blinn as Party Guest
William B. Davidson as First Ship's Officer
Jay Eaton as Man 'Weenie' Flirts with at Ball
Bill Elliott as One of Tom's Friends
June Gittelson as Mrs. Hammerslagger
Ben Hendricks, Jr. as Second Ship's Officer
Franklin Pangborn as Party Guest
Ellinor Vanderveer as Party Guest

Music
 "The Hunt Dance" (Danced by Marilyn Miller)
 "I Was Alone" (Performed by Marilyn Miller)
 "When We Get Our Divorce" (Danced by Marilyn Miller and Joe Donahue)
 "Who?" (Performed by Marilyn Miller and Lawrence Gray)
 "Oh! Didn't He Ramble" (Performed by Lawrence Gray and Men)
 "Sunny" (Cut from film before release)
 "D'Ya Love Me?" (Cut from film before release)
 "Two Little Love Birds" (Cut from film before release)

Production
Marilyn Miller was paid $50,000 for her work on this film, after being paid $100,000 for Sally (1929), her previous film.

The film was completed as a full musical. Due to the backlash against musicals, however, Warner Bros. was forced to make many cuts to the film and much of the original music is missing or severely truncated. The film had originally been announced as a Technicolor production in trade journals. This was dropped once the studio realized that the public was growing weary of musicals. The film was released as a full musical outside of the United States, where a backlash against musicals never occurred. It is not known whether a print of this longer version still exists.

Box office
According to Warner Bros records the film earned $537,000 domestically and $153,000 foreign.

Preservation
Sunny survives only in the American cut version which was released in late 1930 by Warner Bros. This version of the film needs restoration. The current circulating print has a poor sound that was inappropriately transferred from the original Vitaphone discs in the 1950s. The original Vitaphone discs are still extant which could be used to properly restore the original sound to the film.

The black and white version is preserved in the Library of Congress collection.

References

External links

1930 films
1930 musical comedy films
First National Pictures films
1930s English-language films
Films directed by William A. Seiter
American black-and-white films
American musical comedy films
Films based on musicals
1930s American films